"Breathe" is a song written by Stephanie Bentley and Holly Lamar and recorded by American country music artist Faith Hill. Warner Bros. Records released it on October 4, 1999, as the first single from Hill's fourth album of the same name (1999). The song was produced by Byron Gallimore and Hill. "Breathe" became Hill's seventh number one on the Hot Country Songs chart in the United States, spending six weeks at number one. It also peaked at number two on the Billboard Hot 100 chart in April 2000. Despite not peaking at number one, it was the number-one pop single of 2000.

Critical reception
Bill Lamb from About.com said that country singer Faith Hill "leaned heavily in a pop direction" on "Breathe". He described it as "a classic power ballad". In 2005, Blender ranked it at number 167 in their list of "Greatest Songs Since You Were Born". They described it as a "swooning ballad [that] turns country gal into Mississippi queen." The Daily Vault's Alfredo Narvaez said it is a "great song", adding, "if it is not a single already, it must be soon. This song is destined for the prom night halls and the wedding receptions of tomorrow. (Yeah, it's that good and strong.)"

Chart performance
On October 4, 1999, "Breathe" was released US radio, and on February 8, 2000, it was issued as a physical single. The song spent six weeks at number one on the US Billboard Hot Country Songs chart, seventeen weeks at number one on the Hot Adult Contemporary Tracks chart, and one week at number one on the Adult Top 40 chart. The song also reached a peak of number 2 on the Billboard Hot 100 chart for five non-consecutive weeks starting with the week ending April 22, 2000.

Even though "Breathe" never made it to number one on the weekly Billboard Hot 100 chart, it was on the chart for 53 weeks and named the number one single of 2000 on Billboard's year-end countdown. It was one of only four songs in the history of the Hot 100 to be named the number one single of the year without making it to the top of the chart on any of the weekly surveys. (The first was "Wooly Bully" by Sam the Sham and the Pharaohs in 1965, the third was "Hanging by a Moment" by Lifehouse in 2001, and the fourth was "Levitating" by Dua Lipa in 2021.)

In 2009, the single was named the 27th-most-successful song of the 2000s, on the Billboard Hot 100 Songs of the Decade. The song was released in the United Kingdom in May 2000 and reached number 33.

Track listings
US CD single
 "Breathe"  – 4:10
 "It All Comes Down to Love" – 4:16

US Promo The Hex Hector Remixes
 "Breathe"  – 3:55
 "Breathe"  – 4:04
 "Breathe"  – 4:04
 "Breathe"  – 3:44
 "Breathe"  – 3:58
 "Breathe"  – 3:58
 "Breathe"  – 3:58
 "Breathe"  – 10:10
 "Breathe"  – 10:10
 "Breathe"  – 8:55

UK CD single
 "Breathe"  – 4:09
 "This Kiss"  – 3:16
 "What's In it For Me" – 5:36

Europe promo
 "Breathe"  – 4:10
 "Breathe"  – 5:55

Europe maxi-CD
 "Breathe"  – 3:57	
 "Breathe"  – 4:08
 "Breathe"  – 10:10

Other versions
 "Breathe" 2010  – 3:12

Awards and accolades
 2000 Billboard Music Awards: Hot 100 Single of the Year won
 2000 Billboard Music Awards: Hot 100 Airplay Track of the Year won
 2000 Grammy Awards: Best Female Country Vocal Performance won
 2000 Grammy Awards: Best Country Song nominated
 2000 Grammy Awards: Song of the Year nominated

Charts

Weekly charts

Year-end charts

Decade-end charts

All-time charts

Certifications

Release history

Covers and parodies
 Brazilian singer Wanessa Camargo made a cover in Portuguese named "Eu Posso Te Sentir (I Can Feel You)".
 Smartbomb has covered "Breathe" on their CD Yeah. Well, anyway ...
 American singer and voice actress E.G. Daily auditioned with this song for the fifth season of the reality show The Voice.
 Country music parodist Cledus T. Judd recorded a parody of the song, called "Breath" (about a person with bad breath), on his 2002 album, Cledus Envy.
 It was performed by Anna Friel as her character Nicky Roman during the third episode of the 2022 country music drama series Monarch.

Use in other recordings
The Enemy, a member of the drum and bass trio Evol Intent, sampled "Breathe" in his track "Swept Away".

References

1990s ballads
1999 singles
1999 songs
Country ballads
Faith Hill songs
Pop ballads
Song recordings produced by Byron Gallimore
Songs written by Holly Lamar
Songs written by Stephanie Bentley
Warner Records singles